Kaviyoor Sivaprasad is a Malayalam film director, screenwriter and visiting faculty of Malayalam University and SJCC. He is the father of actor-director Sidhartha Siva.

Awards
 2016: Chalachithra Prathiba Award by the Kerala Film Critics Association
 2014: CMS VATAVARAN International Environment & Wildlife Film Festival Award for Best Feature Film - Sthalam

National Film Awards
 1994: National Film Award – Special Mention - Ormayude Theerangalil 
  
 Kerala State Film Awards
 1990: Kerala State Film Award (Special Jury Award) - Vembanad 
 2000: Kerala State Film Award for Producer of the Best Documentary - Palathulliperuvallom

Filmography

References

Malayalam film directors
Screenwriters from Kerala
Year of birth missing (living people)
Living people
Film directors from Kerala
People from Thiruvalla
20th-century Indian film directors
21st-century Indian film directors
Malayalam screenwriters